Desoto Christian Academy is a private school in Olive Branch, Mississippi.

The school was founded in 1970 as Ark Academy, a segregation academy for caucasian students exclusively, one of dozens opened across Mississippi at that time in the wake of Supreme Court rulings on school integration.  Since being renamed Desoto County Academy in 1974, and later renamed Desoto Christian Academy.  The school provides education for pre-kindergarten through the twelfth grade

History

Betty Furniss founded Ark Academy in 1970.  Veronica Elizabeth “Betty” Trainer Furniss was a member of the Citizens' Councils of America.  The name Ark Academy was chosen, because, just as Noah is said to have saved humanity from a great flood, Furniss believed she was saving humanity from school integration.

The school was renamed Desoto County Academy in 1974. The mascot has been changed from Angels to Ambassadors.

References

Private high schools in Mississippi
Private middle schools in Mississippi
Private elementary schools in Mississippi
Preparatory schools in Mississippi
Educational institutions established in 1970
1970 establishments in Mississippi
Segregation academies in Mississippi